Powder and Patch is a novel written by Georgette Heyer under the pen name Stella Martin. It was originally titled The Transformation of Philip Jettan when published by Mills & Boon in 1923. In 1930, the book was republished by William Heinemann minus the original last chapter as Powder and Patch.

Plot summary

Philip Jettan, a handsome and sturdy but tongue-tied youth, is rejected by his true love, Cleone because he is not foppish enough. He resolves to improve himself and travels to Paris, where he becomes a sensation. Once he returns, however, Cleone realizes she wants the old Philip in place of the "painted puppy" she has received.

References
2005, Powder and Patch

External links

 The full text of Powder and Patch at the Internet Archive

Novels by Georgette Heyer
Historical novels
1930 British novels
Mills & Boon books
1923 British novels
Historical romance novels
British romance novels